Robert Tyler (September 9, 1816 – December 3, 1877) was the eldest son of John Tyler, the tenth President of the United States, and Letitia Christian Tyler. He served as the Confederate Register of the Treasury during the American Civil War. Previously, Tyler served as private secretary for his father's presidential administration. In later life, he served as the editor of the Montgomery Advertiser. 

His wife, Priscilla, served in place of the First Lady of the United States from September 10, 1842, to June 26, 1844, between the death of her mother-in-law and President Tyler's remarriage to Julia Gardiner Tyler.

References

1816 births
1877 deaths
Robert Tyler
Children of presidents of the United States
Children of vice presidents of the United States
People of Virginia in the American Civil War
Confederate States Department of the Treasury officials